Hinduism and Judaism are among the oldest existing religions in the world.  The two share some similarities and interactions throughout both the ancient and modern worlds.

Theological similarities

Scholarly efforts to compare Hinduism and Judaism were popular during the Enlightenment era, in the process of arguing the deistic worldview. Hananya Goodman states that Hinduism and Judaism have played an important role in European discussions of idolatry, spirituality, primitive theories of race, language, mythologies, etc.

Both religions were regarded by some scholars to be ethnic religions, and not promoting conversions. Adherents of both religions, however, are found across the world. Both religions share common elements in regard to a complicated system of laws, purity codes, and dietary restrictions, for defining their communities.

Judaism has been compared with Hinduism by Osho Rajneesh and Steven Rosen in their books. They cite the similarities between Brahmins and Jews who viewed themselves as "God's chosen people." Rosen adds that Brahmins had a "community of priests" while Jews had a "Kingdom of Priests".

David Flusser says that the tale of Abraham has many similarities with a certain story from the Upanishads, stating that "One can easily discover parallels in the Upanishads to the Abraham legend".

American biologist Constantine Samuel Rafinesque (1783-1840) in his book The American Nations discusses linguistic and traditional similarities between the two religions. In one chapter he writes:

"Our Noah- is thus NH (pr NOE) which the Jews since pronounced NUH, and even Mnuh! Exactly the same name as given him by the Hindus! And all meaning repose, with many collateral meanings, lawgiver, collecting people, assembly humanity & c. The laws of M'nu are preserved by the Hindus : to him is also ascribed the substance of the Vedas, and the whole Mosaic history till near his own death. But the Hindus have many- M'nus; Adam and Seth were such, by the names of Adimo and Satya."

Scriptures

Barbara Holdrege analyzed the comparative analysis in her writing, about the role of scriptures in Brahmanical, Rabbinic, and Kabbalistic traditions, and noted that cosmological conceptions of sacred scripture in which Veda and Torah are portrayed not merely as restricted corpus of texts, but as a multileveled cosmic reality that encircle both historical and transmundane dimensions. She adds further that sacred status, authority, and function of scripture in these traditions are to a certain extent shaped by these conceptions and thus such a study is essential for understanding the role of Veda and Torah as the paradigmatic signs of their respective traditions.

Judaism, notable for its monotheistic conception of God, has some similarities with those Hindu scriptures that are monotheistic, such as the Vedas. In Judaism God is transcendent, while in Hinduism God is both immanent and transcendent.

Different Hindu sects have a variety of beliefs about the nature and identity of god, believing variously in monotheism, polytheism, pantheism, and panentheism. According to the Upanishads, the Mahabharata, and some Puranas, Narayana is the supreme deity. The Vaishnavite sect considers Vishnu or Krishna to be the supreme god, while Shaivites consider Shiva to be the supreme god.

In Judaism, God is an absolute one, indivisible and incomparable being who is the ultimate cause of all existence. In Hinduism, gods are considered to have a similar status to another when distinct, but may also be seen as "aspects or manifestations of a single, transcendent god", or an "impersonal absolute".

Bernard Jackson points out the extent to which legal regulations, customs, and royal ordinances in Halakha in the Jewish tradition and Dharmaśāstra among Hindus are binding on members of their respective societies. Jackson adds that both Jewish and Hindu law evidence a great sensitivity to the interplay of local custom and authoritative law. He says that in both religions, the writing down of a collection of norms did not necessarily mean that all or even most norms were intended to be enforced, and that the laws connected with royal authority were not necessarily statutory. Wendy Doniger states that Hinduism and Judaism are alike in their tendency toward orthopraxy rather than orthodoxy.

Relations

Historical

Ancient trade and cultural communication between India and the Levant is documented in the Periplus of the Erythraean Sea and the accounts surrounding the Queen of Sheba in the Hebrew Bible.

Bhavishya Purana is regarded by a number of scholars to have predicted Judaism's prophet Moses, and similar parallels are found in the Vedas.

The trade relations of both communities can be traced back to 1,000 BCE and earlier to the time of the Indus Valley civilisation of the Indian subcontinent and the Babylonian culture of Middle East. A Buddhist story describes Indian merchants visiting Baveru (Babylonia) and selling peacocks for public display. Similar, earlier accounts describe monkeys exhibited to the public.

The Torah has also been helpful for understanding relations between these two traditions. Geographical analysis of Israel suggests that the authors of Torah were talking about India, where the selling of animals such as monkeys and peacocks existed.
Trade connections between India and Mediterranean Jewish communities continued, and later, the languages of these cultures started to share linguistic similarities.

Modern
Some of the leading figures in the field of Indology like Theodor Aufrecht, Theodor Goldstücker, Theodor Benfey, Charles Rockwell Lanman, Salomon Lefmann, Gustav Solomon Oppert, Betty Heimann etc. were of Jewish descent.

Jews never faced persecution by Hindus, neither are there any records of Hindus facing persecution at the hands of Jews as both communities share a history of being oppressed, discriminated & forced to convert. The creation of Israel as a Jewish state by Zionists was supported by Hindu nationalists who wanted to make undivided India a Hindu state, most notably M. S. Golwalkar, who said:

The Jews had maintained their race, religion, culture and language; and all they wanted was their natural territory to complete their Nationality.

The world's first Jewish-Hindu interfaith leadership summit, led by the World Council of Religious Leaders, Hindu organisations in India and Jewish organisations in Israel, as well as the American Jewish Committee, was held in New Delhi in February 2007. The summit included the then Chief Rabbi of Israel Yona Metzger, the American Jewish Committee's International Director of Interreligious Affairs David Rosen, a delegation of chief rabbis from around the world, and Hindu leaders from India. During the summit, Rabbi Metzger stated:

Swami Dayananda recognized the similarities of both religions and pointed to the belief in One supreme being, non-conversion, oral recitation of the Veda and the Torah, and the special importance of peace and non-violence. Savarupananda Saraswatiji explained that "Both the Hindu and Jewish communities have a lot in common, we need to discover and nurture these areas for the benefit of millions of people." This meeting included Rabbis such as Daniel Sperber, Yona Metzger, and others. They affirmed a number of points, one of which was:

In 2008, a second Hindu-Jewish summit took place in Jerusalem. Included in the summit was a meeting between Hindu groups and then Israeli President Shimon Peres, where the importance of a strong Israeli-Indian relationship was discussed. The Hindu delegation also met with Israeli politicians Isaac Herzog and Majalli Whbee. Hindu groups visited and said their prayers at the Western Wall, and also paid their respects to Holocaust victims. In 2009, a smaller Hindu-Jewish interfaith meeting organized by the World council of Religious Leaders, Hindu American Foundation and the American Jewish Committee was held in New York and Washington. Hindu and Jewish representatives gave presentations, and participants wore lapel pins combining the Israeli, Indian, and American flags.

About 5,000 Jews reside in India today. The Bnei Menashe are a group of more than 9,000 Jews from the Indian states Manipur and Mizoram who have resided in India since as early as 8th century BC. On 31 March 2005, Sephardi Rabbi, Shlomo Amar, one of Israel's two chief rabbis, accepted the Bnei Menashe's claim of being one of the ten lost tribes considering their devotion to Judaism. His decision was significant because it paved the way for all members of Bnei Menashe to enter Israel under Israel's Law of Return. In the past two decades, some 1,700 Bnei Menashe members have moved to Israel. Israel has reversed the policy of immigration for the remaining 7,200 Bnei Menashe.

There are some who profess a belief in both religions: they regard themselves as Hinjew, a portmanteau of Hindu and Jew.

Many Jews take vipassana and yoga as a supplement to traditional Hasidic musical meditation and dynamic meditation.

According to a report by the Pew Research Center conducted in the US, of all religious groups, Hindus and Jews remain the most successful at retaining their adherents and are the two most educated groups.

See also
 El Shaddai
 History of the Jews in India
 India–Israel relations
 Indian Jews in Israel
 Jewish Buddhist

References

Further reading 

Veda and Torah: Transcending the Textuality of Scripture(1996) by Barbara A. Holdrege.
Hinduism and Judaism compilation
 Larry Yudelson, Passage to India, Jewish Standard August 29, 2014
 Alan Brill, Judaism and World Religions, (2012)

Judaism
Judaism and other religions
India–Israel relations